Thaumatomyia glabra is a species of grass fly in the family Chloropidae.

References

Further reading

External links

 Diptera.info

Chloropinae